Eric Potts (born 13 September 1965) is a Scottish actor, writer and director, who appeared in Coronation Street as the eccentric baker Diggory Compton after playing four smaller parts, the father of Molly Compton, and Brookside as Wrexham Football Club Supporter, Mr Moore.

Originally from Irvine, Ayrshire, Scotland, Eric transferred from law studies at Glasgow University to train at the Bristol Old Vic Theatre School from 1984–1987, then went on tour with the Theatre of Poland. Early television credits included Peak Practice and The Smiths, and then in 1998 he began a two-year stint as oddball character Mr Moore in Brookside. Subsequent appearances were in Heartbeat, The Royal, Last of the Summer Wine and Steel River Blues. In 2005 Eric also had a part in Rochdale-based film The Jealous God and an episode of Doctor Who, while still being active in theatre.

One of his earliest roles was Big Ears in the UK Tour of Noddy Live.

Potts appeared in the pantomime, Dick Whittington, alongside Dame Edna Everage in December 2011 at the New Wimbledon Theatre, London.

In 2013, he played Les Dawson in Cissie and Ada: A Hysterical Rectomy, based upon the characters Cissie and Ada.

He has starred in Pantomime as Widow Twankey in Aladdin and in 2013 as Sarah the Cook in Dick Whittington at the Manchester Opera House.

He directed the UK tour of 'See How They Run for the Reduced Height Theatre in 2014 starring Warwick Davis.

In 2015 he played Sarah the Cook in Dick Whittington at the Liverpool Empire alongside Warren Donnelly, Sally Lindsay and Kurtis Stacey.

2017 see him appear alongside Lee Ryan and Zoe Birkett in Snow White and The Seven Dwarfs and 2018 again with Zoe Birkett,  Louie Spence and Robin Askwith in Aladdin playing Widow Twankey both at Darlington Hippodrome for Qdos Entertainment.

2018 also see him back at The Liverpool Empire with the musical By The Waters of Liverpool.

FilmographyCasualty (2018) (TV series)Hollyoaks (2015) (TV series)Citizen Khan (2014) (TV series)Mount Pleasant (2013) (TV series)Emmerdale (2013, 2018) (TV series)The Royal Today (2008) (TV series)Still Game (2007) (TV series)The British Soap Awards (2006)Doctor Who (2005) (TV series)The Jealous God (2005)Christmas Lights (2004) (TV film)Steel River Blues (2004) (TV series)Last of the Summer Wine (2003) (TV Series)The Royal (2003) (TV series)Heartbeat (2001) (TV series)Between Two Women (2000) (TV Film)Brookside (1998) (TV series)Peak Practice (1995) (TV series)Coronation Street'' (1989, 1996, 1998, 2000, 2005–2006) (TV series)

References

External links

Scottish male television actors
People educated at Irvine Royal Academy
Living people
People from Irvine, North Ayrshire
Bristol Old Vic
Alumni of the University of Glasgow
1965 births
Scottish male stage actors